The 1929–30 Pittsburgh Pirates season was the franchise's last season in Pittsburgh. The Pirates had an extremely poor season, winning only five of 44 games to finish last in the American Division, missing the playoffs. The team moved in 1930 to Philadelphia and NHL hockey did not return to Pittsburgh until 1967.

Offseason

Regular season

Final standings

Record vs. opponents

Game log

A – Played at Atlantic City, New Jersey.
B – Played at Peace Bridge, Buffalo, New York.

Playoffs
The Pirates did not qualify for the playoffs

Player stats

Regular season
Scoring

Goaltending

Note: GP = Games played; G = Goals; A = Assists; Pts = Points; +/- = Plus/minus; PIM = Penalty minutes; PPG=Power-play goals; SHG=Short-handed goals; GWG=Game-winning goals
      MIN=Minutes played; W = Wins; L = Losses; T = Ties; GA = Goals against; GAA = Goals against average; SO = Shutouts;

Awards and records

Transactions

See also
1929–30 NHL season

References

Pitts
Pitts
Pittsburgh Pirates (NHL) seasons